The Frederiksen I Cabinet took office on 27 June 2019 and succeeded the Lars Løkke Rasmussen III Cabinet following the 2019 Danish general election. Headed by Prime Minister Mette Frederiksen, it was a minority government consisting of the Social Democrats. It relied on parliamentary support from the Red–Green Alliance, the Socialist People's Party, and the Social Liberal Party.

On 5 October 2022, Frederiksen announced there would be a new election to the Folketing on 1 November 2022. 

On 2 November 2022, Frederiksen informed the queen that the cabinet would resign that day, continuing in an acting capacity until a new government could be formed. On 13 December 2022, it was announced that a new majority government would be formed consisting of the Social Democrats, Venstre, and the Moderates, led by Frederiksen. The government was formed on 15 December 2022.

List of ministers

References

Frederiksen I, Mette
Frederiksen I Cabinet
Frederiksen I Cabinet